Esperanza Fuentes Roy (born 22 November 1935) is a Spanish actress.

Career
Roy began acting with revue shows before she debuted in film in 1962. Prior to acting, Roy had trained professionals as a dancer. In the 1970s, Roy would appear in several horror films, including Jesús Franco's thriller X-312: Flight to Hell (1971), A Candle for the Devil (1973) opposite Aurora Bautista and Judy Geeson, the zombie film Return of the Blind Dead (1973) and erotic movie La Zorrita en Bikini (1976), directed by Ignacio F. Iquino.

Personal life
Her husband is the Basque film director Javier Aguirre Fernández.

Filmography

References

External links 

1935 births
Living people
Spanish film actresses
Spanish vedettes
20th-century Spanish actresses
21st-century Spanish actresses
Spanish stage actresses